RSM Marko (known as Red Bull Junior Team in 1999-2003) was a Austria auto racing team, who competed in the FIA Formula 3000 Championship.

The team won the drivers' championship in 1996 with Jörg Müller.

Complete Formula 3000 results

In detail 
(key) (Races in bold indicate pole position; races in italics indicate fastest lap)

References

External links
 RSM Marko Motorsportstats.com

Austrian auto racing teams
International Formula 3000 teams
Red Bull sports teams
Auto racing teams established in 1990
Auto racing teams disestablished in 2003
German Formula 3 teams